Boot Camp, also released in the UK as Punishment, is a 2008 psychological thriller film written by Agatha Dominik and John Cox and directed by Christian Duguay.

The film's working title was Straight Edge and it was shot in Fiji as the first film to utilize the southwest Pacific Ocean island country's five-year-old incentive program that had been designed to create jobs while building a film production infrastructure. It is about teenagers sent to a rehabilitation camp (in Fiji) who are then abused and brainwashed.  The film stars Mila Kunis, Gregory Smith and Peter Stormare. Filming began on October 2, 2006 in Fiji and then continued in Calgary, Alberta, Canada.

The film was released on DVD internationally in 2008 and in the U.S. on August 25, 2009.

Plot
This film is the story of a group of unruly teenagers whose parents send them to a rehabilitation boot camp to turn them around. The camp collects each child individually, then delivers them to the boot camp facility owned by Dr. Arthur Hail, on a remote island in Fiji. There are no walls to stop the teenagers from leaving, but escape is impractical due to the surrounding sea. On arriving at the camp, the teenagers are forced to wear cuffs with sensors around their ankles—if they attempt to escape, security will be alerted.

The main teenagers featured are Sophie, her boyfriend Ben, Danny and Trina. As time passes on the island, Sophie rebels against Dr. Hail and once Ben joins her, the two escape to a nearby island. However, they are recaptured and Ben is told he will be sent home. One morning, while on a run, Logan has the male teenagers go swimming. However, Danny, who can't swim, drowns and Logan tries to get Ben to help cover it up by threatening him with solitary confinement, but Ben refuses.

Meanwhile, Sophie discovers that Logan has raped Trina and when Logan is put before the camp to admit responsibility for Danny's death, she reveals this to the rest of the teenagers, many of whom also were offered yellow shirts by Logan in exchange for sex. As the teenagers surround Logan, Sophie turns the attention onto Hail, at which point Ben announces to the shocked teenagers that this isn't the first death to occur on a camp run by Dr. Hail.

The teenagers run amok and burn down the entire campsite. In addition, they go after Logan, who dies when his Toyota Land Cruiser crashes into a burning building. At this point they turn their attention solely to Hail, who tries to shoot them in the hope that he can restore order. However, after finding out his gun wasn't loaded, he is thrown into solitary confinement, to be left for the police to arrest. As the film fades out, we see images of the teenagers celebrating freedom and swimming in the ocean. A message also appears on screen stating that since the 1970s, when these type of camps were introduced in real life, over 40 deaths have occurred.

Cast
Mila Kunis as Sophie Bauer
Gregory Smith as Benjamin "Ben" Richards
Peter Stormare as Dr. Arthur Hail
Christopher Jacot as Danny Randall
Tygh Runyan as Logan
Colleen Rennison as Ellen Gildner
Grace Bauer as Danny's Mom
Daniel Hayes as Marine Madison
Regine Nehy as Trina Foster
Alejandro Rae as Jack Wilcox
Lexie Huber as Marianne Bauer (Sophie's strict mother)
Serge Bouge as Carl Bauer (Sophie's strict stepfather)

Reception

Critical response
Choi Jung-in of South Korea's JoongAng Daily wrote, "From the outset, director Christian Duguay makes it clear that Boot Camp is based on true events. ...I loved Duguay's message that children should never be abused under the pretext of parental love."

References

External links
 
 
 
 Boot Camp at The New York Times

2008 films
2008 psychological thriller films
2000s American films
2000s Canadian films
2000s English-language films
American psychological thriller films
American teen films
Canadian psychological thriller films
Canadian teen films
English-language Canadian films
Films about juvenile delinquency
Films directed by Christian Duguay (director)
Films scored by Normand Corbeil
Films set in Fiji
Films shot in Fiji
Teen thriller films